The Cat may refer to:

Nickname 
 Mathilde Carré (1910-2007), French spy, double and possibly triple agent
 Peter Bonetti (1941–2020), English footballer
 Greg Cattrano (born 1975), American lacrosse player
 Ernest Miller (born 1964), American professional wrestler
 Félix Potvin (born 1971), Canadian hockey player
 Carl Thompson (boxer) (born 1964), British boxer
 Emile Francis (born 1926), Canadian hockey player, coach, and general manager, most notably of the New York Rangers
 Bogdan Lobonț (born 1978), Romanian football player, now under contract with AS Roma
 Phil Tufnell (born 1966), British television personality and former test cricketer for England
 Tony Meo (born 1959), English snooker player
 Dave Gahan (born 1962), English singer-songwriter
 Russell Westbrook (born 1988), American professional basketball player

Film
 The Cat (1947 film), an Argentine film
 The Cat (1966 film), an American film
 The Cat (1971 film), a French film 
 The Cat (1977 film), an Italian film
 The Cat (1988 film), a German film
 The Cat (1992 film), a Hong Kong film directed by Lam Ngai Kai
 The Cat (2011 film), a South Korean film

Television
 T.H.E. Cat, a 1966–1967 TV series starring Robert Loggia
 "The Cat/The Black Cat", an episode of Spider-Man: The Animated Series
 The Cat (Red Dwarf), a character in the TV show Red Dwarf

Comics
 The Cat, original title of a Marvel Comics series and character, later renamed Tigra
 The Cat, alternate name for Walter Hardy, a Marvel Comics character
 The Cat, original name for Catwoman, a DC Comics character
 The Cat, alternate name for Shen Kuei, a Marvel Comics character
 The Cat, English name of the title character of the Belgian comic strip Le Chat

Ferry services
 HSC The Cat (renamed HSC Hai Xia Hao), formerly operated in the Gulf of Maine
 Bay Ferries Great Lakes, in Lake Ontario
 The Cat, a marketing name of the HSC INCAT 046 vessel, a ferry

Other uses
 The Cat (album), a 1964 jazz album by Jimmy Smith
 The title character of the book The Cat in the Hat and the related movie
 The Cat, a fictional character from the novel Animal Farm
 An informal term for Catawissa Creek
 "The Cat", a guitar model manufactured by Aria

See also
 Cat (disambiguation)
 The Cats (disambiguation)
 Catman (disambiguation)
 The Big Cat (disambiguation)
 La Chatte (The She-Cat), a French novel